The 1931–32 Swiss International Ice Hockey Championship was the 17th edition of the international ice hockey championship in Switzerland. HC Davos won the championship by finishing first in the final round.

First round

Eastern Series

Final 
 HC Davos - EHC St. Moritz 6:2

Central Series

Western Series

Semifinals 
 Lycée Jaccard - HC Château-d’Œx 2:1
 HC Rosey Gstaad - Star Lausanne 6:0

Final 
 HC Rosey Gstaad - Lycée Jaccard 6:1

Final round

External links 
Swiss Ice Hockey Federation – All-time results

Inter
Swiss International Ice Hockey Championship seasons